iTunes Live from Sydney may refer to:

 iTunes Live from Sydney (The Presets EP), 2008
 iTunes Live from Sydney (Diesel EP), 2009
 iTunes Live from Sydney (Wolfmother EP), 2010